Tenom is the capital of the Tenom District in the Interior Division of Sabah, Malaysia. Its population was estimated to be around 5,148 in 2010. It is located about 176 kilometres south of Kota Kinabalu and 128 kilometres north of Long Pasia, which is the one of the famous attraction in Sabah. In the early days of British colonial rule in Malaysia, the town was called Fort Birch. The town is considered the unofficial capital of the Murut community, whose most important festival, the annual Pesta Kalimaran (Kalimaran Festival), is held in the town. It is also the main gateway to other areas within the Murut heartland and the minority of Lundayeh.

Economy

Agriculture 
The fertile land in Tenom and its surrounding area has made it primarily an agricultural area. The main agriculture sources in the area are rubber while soy beans, maize, vegetables, cocoa and coffee became the second contributor to the Tenom economy.

Coffee
Tenom coffee is a popular type of kopi, a Malay term for coffee beverage made from beans grown in Tenom. Among the main and largest producer of Tenom coffee is the Yit Foh Tenom Coffee, Tong Fah Coffee Factory and Fatt Choi Tenom Coffee.

Tenom coffee is made from Robusta variety. The coffee bean was processed using traditional firewood and drum rotation methods followed for almost 50 years without adding any artificial ingredients or colourings.

History
Originally, coffee started to be planted in Sabah during the administration of British North Borneo, but only focused in the area of the east coast on the forest reserve near mangrove areas. However, due to an outbreak of disease, it was abandoned in 1910. Since then, coffee production was concentrated in the west coast area. Tenom received attention when the British North Borneo Chartered Company (BNBCC) established coffee and other plantations in the area. To take the resources to major towns, a railway line from Melalap to Jesselton (now Kota Kinabalu) was built by the British in the late 1890s. To increase the coffee production, many labourers from China, mainly those of Hakka and Cantonese descent were brought to Tenom by the British as local workforce. Today, Tenom is widely known as an agriculture site with large coffee production and has been dubbed as the "Sabah's coffee capital". Together with cocoa, rice field and fruit crops, coffee is the second largest contributor to the Tenom agriculture economy after rubber. Due to its large demand from other countries since 2010s, the government began to help to address the shortage of raw coffee supply in Tenom.

Tourism 
Among the primary tourist attractions in the district are the Sabah Agricultural Park (Lagud Seberang Agriculture Research Station), the Tenom Orchid Centre and the Murut Cultural Centre. The town is also known in the tourism industry for whitewater rafting on the Padas River and the coffee factory. Tenom railway station is the final stop of the Sabah State Railway, which originates from Tanjung Aru.

Gallery

See also
 Ipoh white coffee
 List of coffee drinks

References

External links 

Tenom District
Towns in Sabah